Sogmai, or Suomai is a village in Günsa Township, Gar County, Tibet Autonomous Region, China. It is the site of the Ngari Gunsa Airport.

See also
List of towns and villages in Tibet

References

Populated places in Tibet